Parkinson disease 3 (autosomal dominant, Lewy body) is a protein that in humans is encoded by the PARK3 gene.

References

Further reading 

 
 
 

Human proteins